George Booth may refer to:

 George Booth (cricketer) (1767–?), English cricketer
 George Booth (cartoonist) (1926–2022), American cartoonist for The New Yorker
 George Booth, 1st Baron Delamer (1622–1684), English Royalist, and instigator of the Booth Uprising in 1659
 George Booth, 2nd Earl of Warrington (1675–1758), English aristocrat
 George Booth (pirate) (died 1701), English pirate active on the Indian Ocean during the Golden Age of Piracy
 George Gough Booth (1864–1949), American newspaper publisher, philanthropist and founder of the Cranbrook Educational Community in Bloomfield Hills, Michigan
 George Booth (politician) (1891–1960), New South Wales politician
 George Macaulay Booth (1877–1971), British businessman and a director of the Bank of England
 George Formby (1904–1961), English singer born George Hoy Booth